Dimitri Champion (born 6 September 1983 in La Rochelle) is a French former road bicycle racer, who rode professionally between 2007 and 2012 for the ,  and  squads. He was best known for winning the French National Road Race Championships in 2009.

Major results

2004
 4th Chrono Champenois
 6th Paris–Mantes-en-Yvelines
2005
 1st  Time trial, National Under–23 Road Championships
 1st Stage 4 Tour Alsace
 5th Chrono Champenois
2006
 1st  Road race, National Amateur Road Championships
 5th Overall Tour de la Guadeloupe
1st Stage 6
2007
 2nd Time trial, National Road Championships
2008
 4th Road race, National Road Championships
2009
 1st  Road race, National Road Championships
 1st  Overall Circuit des Ardennes
 1st Tour du Finistère
 2nd Overall Boucle De l'Artois
 4th Trophée Des Grimpeurs
 6th Overall Kreiz Breizh Elites
1st Stage 1
 9th Tour du Doubs
2011
 4th Duo Normand (with László Bodrogi)

References

External links 
Profile at Bouygues Télécom official website

1983 births
Living people
Sportspeople from La Rochelle
French male cyclists
Tour de Guadeloupe stage winners
Cyclists from Nouvelle-Aquitaine